Protopolyclinidae is a family of tunicates belonging to the order Aplousobranchia.

Genera:
 Condominium Kott, 1992
 Monniotus Millar, 1988
 Protopolyclinum Millar, 1960

References

Aplousobranchia